The East Tennessee Railway, L.P.  is a short line railroad connecting CSX Transportation and the Norfolk Southern Railway in Johnson City, Tennessee. Since 2005, the railroad has been owned by Genesee and Wyoming, an international operator of short line railroads, as part of its Rail Link group. The railroad uses a single diesel locomotive, SW1200 #214, to serve a small number of industries and a transloading facility, as well as to provide interchange services between NS and CSX.

The current regular gauge railroad is a remnant of a larger, narrow gauge railroad, the East Tennessee and Western North Carolina Railroad, chartered in 1866 to haul iron ore from Cranberry, North Carolina to Johnson City across the Appalachian Mountains. Through an acquisition and track extensions, the railroad grew to serve Boone, North Carolina and Saginaw, North Carolina. ET&WNC used dual gauge tracks between Johnson City and Elizabethton; eventually the railroad ceased all narrow gauge operations and only operated standard gauge service on this one section. Later, with a change in ownership this limited line was reorganized as the East Tennessee Railway.

In 2003, the last train left Elizabethton, TN and in 2009 the line was formally abandoned and railbanked. The rails and ties were removed in 2012 to make way for a rail-trail.  The East Tennessee Railway still services customers around the yard in Johnson City and still makes deliveries to the CSXT and NS.
ETRY started out with a two-man crew for many years, and have just now upped to a three-man crew.  Operations are Monday through Friday.

See also

Tweetsie Railroad
East Tennessee and Western North Carolina Railroad
Genesee & Wyoming Inc.

References

External links
East Tennessee Railway official webpage - Genesee and Wyoming website
Tennessee Shortline Railroad Directory
HawkinsRails.net East Tennessee Rwy page

Tennessee railroads
Genesee & Wyoming